Grindelia grandiflora, the manyray gumweed, is a North American species of flowering plants in the family Asteraceae. It is native to the south-central United States and north-central Mexico, in the states of Texas and Coahuila.

Grindelia grandiflora grows in grasslands, scrublands, ditches, and roadsides, and along streambanks. It is an annual herb sometimes as much as 200 cm (80 inches or almost 7 feet) tall. The plant usually produces numerous flower heads in open, branching arrays. Each head has 17-26 ray flowers, surrounding a large number of tiny disc flowers.

References

grandiflora
Flora of Coahuila
Flora of Texas
Plants described in 1852